Norte, the End of History is a 2013 Filipino psychological drama film written and directed by Lav Diaz. Lasting for more than four hours, the film explores themes of crime, class, and family.

Screened at the Un Certain Regard section at the 2013 Cannes Film Festival, as well as the 2013 Toronto International Film Festival, the main slate of 2013 New York Film Festival, and the Masters section of the 2013 San Diego Asian Film Festival, the film has received wide acclaim for its riveting storytelling and unique cinematography. The film also won four awards including Best Picture and Best Actress at the 2014 Gawad Urian Awards.

The film had a limited release in the Philippines on March 11, 2014, and its wide theatrical release on September 10, 2014. It was selected as the Filipino entry for the Best Foreign Language Film at the 87th Academy Awards, but was not nominated.

Plot 
The lives of three people take a turn when one of them commits a crime.

Joaquin (Archie Alemania) is failing miserably at providing for his family. When Joaquin's money lender gets murdered by a disillusioned law student, Fabian (Sid Lucero), the crime is pinned on him. In prison, he is transformed by misery and solitude.

Left to fend for the family, his wife Eliza (Angeli Bayani) pours all of her strength into battling with despair as she ekes out a living for their children.

The real perpetrator, Fabian, roams free. His disillusionment with his country—its history of revolutions marred by betrayal and crimes unpunished—drives him to the edge of insanity.

Cast 
Sid Lucero as Fabian
Angeli Bayani as Eliza
Archie Alemania as Joaquin
Angelina Kanapi as Hoda
Soliman Cruz as Wakwak
Hazel Orencio as Ading
Mae Paner as Magda

Reception

Critical reception
Norte, the End of History received critical acclaim, with a "fresh" score of 93% on Rotten Tomatoes based on 40 reviews, with an average rating of 8 out of 10. The critical consensus states "Its four-hour length is undeniably imposing, but Norte, the End of History rewards patient viewers with an absorbing, visually expansive viewing experience." The film has a score of 81 on Metacritic based on 10 reviews, signifying "universal acclaim".

A.O. Scott of New York Times writes, "More than four hours long, filmed in expansive takes with almost no close-ups and very few camera movements, Lav Diaz's "Norte, the End of History" is a tour de force of slow cinema. It is the work of a director as fascinated by decency as by ugliness, and able to present the chaos of life in a series of pictures that are at once luminously clear and endlessly mysterious."

Neil Young of The Hollywood Reporter gave an underwhelming review by saying, "There's little in the way of genuine depth, complexity or nuance here, Diaz instead seeks to convey the illusion of profundity by having various characters throw around weighty social and philosophical verbiage in thuddingly sophomoric fashion."

At the end of 2013, British magazine Sight & Sound listed Norte as one of the Top 10 films of 2013, tying for the ninth spot with the French film Stranger by the Lake. The film also was chosen by the International Cinephile Society Awards 2014 as one of the Best Films not released in 2013. Norte was also ranked at #15 at Film Comment's Top 20 Best Films of 2014.

Awards and nominations

See also 
List of submissions to the 87th Academy Awards for Best Foreign Language Film
List of Philippine submissions for the Academy Award for Best Foreign Language Film

Notes

References

External links 

San Diego Asian Film Festival Website (2013)

2013 films
2013 crime drama films
2010s psychological drama films
Philippine crime drama films
Philippine psychological drama films
2010s Tagalog-language films
Films directed by Lav Diaz